Beams is the fifth studio album by Matthew Dear. It was released via Ghostly International in 2012.

Critical reception 
At Metacritic, which assigns a weighted average score out of 100 to reviews from mainstream critics, Beams received an average score of 78% based on 29 reviews, indicating "generally favorable reviews".

AllMusic named it one of their "Favorite Electronic Albums of 2012". Clash placed it at number 28 on its list of the "Top 40 Albums of 2012". MusicOMH named it the 3rd best album of 2012.

Track listing

Charts

References

External links 
 
 

2012 albums
Matthew Dear albums
Ghostly International albums